Gisele Fox is an American fashion model.

Career
Fox started modeling in her native Seattle, Washington, after having lived in Italy for four and a half years. Her looks have been described as "gamine" and "elfin"; she has been compared to the supermodel Karen Elson. She has modeled for Miu Miu, Valentino, Marni, Marc Jacobs, Fendi, Dior, Margiela, Lanvin, Givenchy, Hermès, Jil Sander, Calvin Klein, Marc Jacobs and Prada (which she closed). She has appeared in advertisements for Prada, Versace, Marc Jacobs, Coach New York, Michael Kors, and McQ,. Fox has been on the cover of Interview as well as Vogue Thailand.

Fox is known for her pixie cut.

References 

Living people
2001 births
American female models
People from Seattle
American expatriates in Italy
Elite Model Management models
21st-century American women